Koivukylä (English meaning: birch village) is a district and major region of the municipality of Vantaa, Finland. The district hosts a multitude of services, such as several stores and a library. It has its own railway station, the Koivukylä railway station, which serves commuter trains around Greater Helsinki.

The Koivukylä major region consists of six districts: Havukoski, Ilola, Päiväkumpu, Asola, the central Koivukylä, and Rekola. The main hospital of Vantaa, Peijas Hospital, is located in the major region, in Asola.

Transport
Koivykylä has the following public transportation access:
Koivukylä railway station:
K-trains to Helsinki and Kerava
T-train during night hours
Bus lines:
To Helsinki (623, 721)
To Tikkurila (624, 631)
To Ilola (624)
To Peijas Hospital (623, 625)
To Korso (587, 631)
To Hakunila and Mellunmäki metro station (587)

Leinelä railway station:
P-trains to Helsinki-Vantaa Airport, Myyrmäki and Helsinki
I-train to Tikkurila and Helsinki

See also

References

Districts of Vantaa
Major regions of Vantaa